This is a list of artists born in Trinidad and Tobago, or whose artworks are associated with that country.

A
 M. P. Alladin (1919–1980)
 Sybil Atteck (1911–1975)
 Nicole Awai (born 1966)

B
 Isaiah James Boodhoo (1932–2004)
 Cheryl Byron (c. 1947–2003)

C
 LeRoy Clarke (1938–2021)
 Vera Cudjoe (born 1928)

G
 Esther Griffith
 Christopher Guinness (born 1981)

H
 Boscoe Holder (1921–2007)
 Christian Holder (born 1949)

L
 Amy Leong Pang (1908–1989)
 Che Lovelace (born 1969)
 John Lyons (poet) (born 1933)

M
 Brian Mac Farlane (born 1957)
 Althea McNish (1924–2020)
 Wendell McShine (born 1972)
 Peter Minshall (born 1941)

N
 Norris Iton (born 1951)

O
 Horace Ové (born 1939)
 Zak Ové (born 1966)

S
 Roberta Silva (born 1971)
 Hugh Stollmeyer (1912–1982)

T
 Denyse Thomasos (1964–2012)

List of Trinidad and Tobago artists
Trinidad and Tobago
Artists